Melolonthinae is a subfamily of the scarab beetles (family Scarabaeidae). It is a very diverse group; distributed over most of the world, it contains over 11,000 species in over 750 genera. Some authors include the scarab subfamilies Euchirinae and Pachypodinae as tribes in the Melolonthinae.

Unlike some of their relatives, their habitus is usually not bizarre. They resemble the Rutelinae in being fairly plesiomorphic in outward appearance. Like in many Scarabaeidae, males have large fingered antennae, while those of the females are smaller and somewhat knobby. In the Melolonthinae, this sexual dimorphism is particularly pronounced. Many species have striking – though rarely brilliant or iridescent – hues and bold patterns of hairs.

Being often quite sizeable and swarming in numbers at certain times, for example the Amphimallon, Phyllophaga and Polyphylla "june beetles" or the Melolontha cockchafers – all from tribe Melolonthini – feature widely in folklore. Some Melolonthinae are economically significant pests. Other than the Melolonthini, the most diverse tribes are the Ablaberini, Liparetrini, Macrodactylini, Tanyproctini and Sericini.

Description 
Melolonthinae adults range from 3 to 58 mm in length and are usually brown or black in colour. Some species are shiny, while many are covered in setae or scales. The clypeus, a structure on the head above the mouthparts, is not armed with teeth. There are two antennae, each with 7-10 segments of which the last 3-7 segments are elongate and form a club, and the antennal bases are usually concealed from above. The scutellum is exposed at the base of the elytra. The margins of the elytra are straight instead of strongly curved. Each leg ends in a pair of tarsal claws that are often toothed or double.

Larvae are C-shaped with a white/cream body and a darker, well-sclerotised head. They can be distinguished from other scarabaeid larvae by the galea and lacinia either partly fused proximally or fitting tightly together, the mandibles lacking stridulatory areas, the apical segment of the antenna about as wide as its penultimate segment, and the anal cleft usually Y-shaped or angulate.

Life cycle 
The Melolonthinae life cycle has the four stages of egg, larva, pupa and adult, similar to other beetles. Eggs are laid in soil, which is also where the larval and pupal stages occur. Adults occur above ground. The larval stage is long and may last up to two years, whereas the adult stage is short and lasts only a few days or weeks.

Diet 
Larval melolonthines feed on plant roots and humus. Known host plants include grasses, clover and sugarcane. Adults may (e.g. Automolius, Diphucephala, Heteronyx, Liparetrus, Phyllotocus and Sericesthis) or may not feed (e.g. Antitrogus and Rhopaea). Adults that feed do so on the leaves of trees, such as eucalypts, or on flowers or pollen.

Behaviour 
Adults are usually crepuscular or nocturnal, but the flower- and pollen-feeding species are often diurnal. They are often attracted to light.

In feeding species, adults gather on trees and this helps them find each other to mate. In non-feeding species, virgin females emit a sex pheromone so that males can find them.

Pests 
Larvae of Sericesthis spp. are pasture pests, while larvae of Dermolepida albohirtum, Antitrogus and Lepidiota are sugarcane pests. Lepidiota stigma is another sugarcane pest and also attacks corn, sorghum and various fruits. Adults of Phyllophaga spp. can sometimes cause complete defoliation of deciduous trees.

Systematics

According to various authors, the living Melolonthinae are divided into about 20-30 tribes. Some notable genera and species are also listed here:

Ablaberini Burmeister, 1855 – including Camentini
Automoliini Britton, 1978
Chasmatopterini Lacordaire, 1856
Colymbomorphini Blanchard, 1850 – including Stethaspini and Xylonychini
Stethaspis Hope, 1837
Comophorinini Britton, 1957 – including Comophini
Dichelonychini Burmeister 1855
Diphucephalini Britton, 1957
Diphycerini Medvedev, 1952 – sometimes in Macrodactylini
Diplotaxini Kirby, 1837 – sometimes in Melolonthini
Heteronychini Britton, 1957
Heteronyx Guérin-Méneville, 1838
Hopliini Latreille, 1829
Lichniini Burmeister, 1844
Liparetrini Burmeister, 1855 – including Allarini, Colpochilini
Macrodactylini Kirby, 1837 – including Dichelonyciini
Maechidiini Burmeister, 1855
Melolonthini Leach, 1819 – including Rhizotrogini
Amphimallon
Brahmina
Holotrichia
Leucopholis 
Melolontha – cockchafers, May bugs
Phyllophaga – May beetles
Polyphylla
Rhizotrogus
Oncerini LeConte, 1861
Pachytrichini Burmeister, 1855
Phyllotocidiini Britton, 1957
Podolasiini Howden, 1997 – sometimes in Hopliini
Scitalini Britton, 1957
Sericini Dalla Torre, 1912
Maladera
Sericoidini Burmeister, 1855
Systellopini Sharp, 1877
Tanyproctini Erichson, 1847 – includes Pachydemini

In addition, a prehistoric tribe, the Cretomelolonthini, is only known from fossils.

Several genera are of unclear relations; they are not yet firmly placed in a tribe:

Acoma
Conebius Fuavel, 1903
Costelytra – Liparetrini?
Hemictenius – Pachydemini?
Metascelis Westwood, 1842
Mycernus – Colymbomorphini?
Odontria – Liparetrini?
Prodontria – Liparetrini?
Psilodontria – Colymbomorphini?
Scythrodes – Liparetrini?
Sericospilus – Liparetrini?
Xenaclopus

"Anonetus" and "Tryssus", both used by Erichson in 1847, are nomina nuda. Holophylla and Hoplorida are of uncertain validity.

References

http://insects.tamu.edu/research/collection/hallan/test/Arthropoda/Insects/Coleoptera/Family/Scarabaeidae.txt

 
Beetle subfamilies
Articles containing video clips